Lacy may refer to any of the following:

People

Surname
 Alan J. Lacy (born 1953), American businessman
 Antonio Lacy (born 1957), Spanish doctor and surgeon
 Arthur J. Lacy (1876–1975), American politician and lawyer
 Benjamin W. Lacy (1839–1895), American  lawyer
 Bill Lacy, U.S. political operative and business executive 
 Bill N. Lacy, U.S. architect
 Bo Lacy (born 1980), American football player
 Charles L. Lacy (1885–1942), American politician
 Chris Lacy (born 1996), American football player
 David Lacy, Scottish theologian
 Ed Lacy (1911–1968), American  mystery writer
 Eddie Lacy (born 1990), American football player
 Edgar Lacy (1944–2011), American basketball player
 Elizabeth B. Lacy (born 1945), American  lawyer
 Franz Moritz von Lacy (1725–1801), Austrian field marshal
 George Carleton Lacy (1888–1951), American Methodist Bishop
 Gilbert Lacy (1834–1878), English cricketer
 Harriette Deborah Lacy (1807–1874), English actress 
 Henry de Lacy, 3rd Earl of Lincoln (1251–1311)
 Hugh De Lacy (1910–1986), American  politician
 James Lacy (actor), British stage actor and theatre manager
 James T. Lacy, American politician in Virginia
 Jim Lacy, American basketball player
 Jeff Lacy (born 1977), American  boxer
 Jennifer Lacy (born 1983), American basketball player
 Jerry Lacy (born 1936), American  soap opera actor
 John Lacy (1615?–1681) English comic actor and playwright
 John Lacy (born 1951) English footballer
 Kerry Lacy, American relief pitcher
 Lee Lacy (born 1948), American  baseball player
 Len Lacy (1900–1998), member of the Louisiana House of Representatives
 Michael Rophino Lacy (1795–1867), Irish musician
 Norman Lacy (born 1941), Australian politician
 Onawa Lacy (born 1982), American  beauty queen
 Paul Eston Lacy (1924–2005), U.S. pathologist 
 Peter von Lacy (1678–1751), Russian commander
 Philippe De Lacy (1917–1995), American silent film era child actor
 Preston Lacy (born 1969), American  actor
 Roger de Lacy (died after 1106), Norman nobleman
 Sterling Byrd Lacy, American  politician
 Steve Lacy (1934–2004), American  jazz saxophonist
 Steve Lacy (singer) (born 1998), American singer, musician, songwriter, and record producer
 Suzanne Lacy (born 1945), American  artist
 Tania Lacy (born 1965), Australian comedian
 Thomas Hailes Lacy (1809–1873) British actor, playwright, theatrical manager, bookseller, and theatrical publisher
 Venus Lacy (born 1967), American  basketball player
 Walter Lacy (1809–1898), English actor
 William Lacy (died 1582), English martyr
 William Henry Lacy (1888–1925), American Methodist missionary to China
 William H. Lacy Jr. (born 1945), American  businessman

Given name
Men
Lacy Banks (1943–2012), American sportswriter
Lacy Clay (born 1956), U.S. Representative from Missouri's 1st congressional district
Lacy Thornburg (born 1929), American lawyer and retired United States District Judge

Women
Lacy Barnes-Mileham (born 1964), American discus throw track and field champion
Lacy Schnoor (born 1985), American freestyle skier

See also
Lacy, Indiana
Lacy, South Dakota
Lacy, Texas
Lace (disambiguation)
Laci (disambiguation)
de Lacy, an old Norman noble family
Lacy Baronets
Lacy Island, Nunavut, Canada
Lacy Barnes-Mileham, an American discus thrower
Lacey (disambiguation)
Justice Lacy (disambiguation)
Blue Lacy, the Texas dog breed known as Lacys
William Lacy Carter (1925-2017), American businessman and politician

Unisex given names